The Title are a British four-piece indie band based in Stoke-on-Trent, England, and signed with Sons Ltd. Their debut single, "Slippin' 'n' Slidin", charted at No. 15 in the UK Independent Singles Chart with the follow-up, "Madman" charting at No. 5.

Singles 
 "Slippin 'n' Slidin" (21 June 2007) SONS Records No. 15 UK
 "Madman" (24 March 2008) SONS Records No. 5 UK

References

External links
 The Title - Official Website

British indie rock groups
Music in Stoke-on-Trent
Musical quartets